John Joseph may refer to:

 John Joseph (historian) (1923–2020), American educator and Middle East historian
 John Joseph (bishop) (1932–1998), Catholic bishop of Faisalabad, Pakistan
 John Joseph (singer) (born 1962), American hardcore punk singer
 John Joseph (actor) (born 1984), British actor
 Mar Hnan-Isho II (fl. 774–780),  John Joseph, Patriarch of the Church of the East
 John C. Joseph, documentary filmmaker who won an Academy Award for Gravity Is My Enemy
 John Joseph, screenwriter whose works include the film Change of Habit
John Joseph of the Cross (1654–1739), Italian saint
John Joseph of Austria,  Spanish general and political figure
John Joseph (rebel), African-American participant in the 1854 Eureka Rebellion in Australia

See also
Joseph (surname)